Marijeta Šarlija (née Vidak; born 14 August 1992) is a Croatian handball player for Fleury Loiret HB and the Croatian national team.

References

External links

1992 births
Living people
Croatian female handball players
Sportspeople from Virovitica
Expatriate handball players
Croatian expatriate sportspeople in Romania
Croatian expatriate sportspeople in France
RK Podravka Koprivnica players